The R159 road is a regional road in Ireland linking Enfield and Knightsbrook in County Meath. It passes through the village of Rathmolyon.

See also 

 Roads in Ireland
 National primary road
 National secondary road

References 

 Roads Act 1993 (Classification of Regional Roads) Order 2006 – Department of Transport

Regional roads in the Republic of Ireland
Roads in County Meath